John George Sykes (5 November 1911 – 11 January 1980) was an English footballer who played as a left back. He made 40 appearances in the Football League without scoring, playing for Birmingham and Millwall.

Sykes was born in Wombwell, Yorkshire, and played for Wombwell F.C. before joining Birmingham in 1932. After three years in the reserve team, he started his league career well, but lost form in his second season and moved on to Millwall in 1937. He went on to keep a pub in Birmingham.

References

1911 births
1980 deaths
People from Wombwell
English footballers
Association football fullbacks
Wombwell F.C. players
Birmingham City F.C. players
Millwall F.C. players
English Football League players
Sportspeople from Yorkshire